Clavus peristera is a species of sea snail, a marine gastropod mollusk in the family Drilliidae.

Description

Distribution
This marine species occurs in the Pacific Ocean off Gorgona Island,  Colombia.

References

External links

peristera
Gastropods described in 1927